Helen Bekele Tola (born 21 November 1994) is an Ethiopian long-distance runner. She finished second at the 2019 Tokyo Marathon, and third at the 2021 Berlin Marathon. She has also won the Annecy and Barcelona Marathons, as well as multiple other long-distance events. Born in Ethiopia, she now lives in Switzerland.

Personal life
Helen Bekele Tola was born in Ethiopia. In 2005, she moved to Geneva, Switzerland. Tola is married to Tesfaye Eticha, who competed for Switzerland at the 2012 Summer Olympics.

Career
Tola competes for the Stade Geneva athletics club. In 2016, Tola won the Annecy Marathon, breaking the course record by over three minutes. In the same year, she came second at the Lake Maggiore Half Marathon in a time of 1:15:37. In 2017, she won the Barcelona Marathon in a course record time of 2:25:04. It was over four minutes better than her previous personal best. In the same year, she won the  half-marathon event in a course record time of 1:09:47. In 2018, Tola came second at the 10 km Corrida de Houilles race, sixth at the Berlin Marathon, and ninth at the Ras Al Khaimah Half Marathon.

In 2019, Tola finished second at the Tokyo Marathon, in a personal best time of 2:21:01. She also finished fourth at the Berlin Marathon, and was in the leading group of four racers, alongside eventual winner Ashete Bekere, Mare Dibaba, and Sally Chepyego Kaptich, for most of the race. She finished in 2:21:36, 25 seconds slower than her personal best. Later in the year, Tola won the   race from Murten to Fribourg in a course record time of 57:50. She broke Franziska Rochat-Moser's 22 year old previous record by over a minute. She also won the 10 km race at the Lausanne Marathon, the 10 km San Silvestre Vallecana, in a personal best time of 30:47, and the Scalata al Castello  race in Arezzo, Italy.

In 2020, Tola won the Madrid 10k Run, beating pre-race favourite Ruth Chepng'etich. She finished in 30:50, the fourth fastest ever time at the event. Later in the year, she came second at a Berlin 10k invitational event; her time of 30:59 was the fifth fastest time of the year. She also won the 10,000 metres event at the Swiss Athletics Championships as a guest runner, and came fourth in the one hour run race of the Memorial Van Damme Diamond League event. Tola has also won the road race at the Escalade de Genève on four occasions. Tola expressed a desire to represent Switzerland at the 2020 Summer Olympics.

In 2021, Tola won the Belp Marathon. Later in the year, she came third at the 2021 Berlin Marathon, finishing behind fellow Ethiopians Gotytom Gebreslase and Hiwot Gebrekidan. She came ninth at the 2021 Tokyo Marathon.

References

External links
 
 World Athletics

1994 births
Living people
Ethiopian female marathon runners
Ethiopian expatriate sportspeople in Switzerland
Ethiopian female long-distance runners
21st-century Ethiopian women